Stictane is a genus of moths in the family Erebidae erected by George Hampson in 1900.

Species
 Stictane bipunctulata (van Eecke, 1927)
 Stictane chinesica (Draudt, 1931)
 Stictane ciliata Holloway, 2001
 Stictane filiformis Holloway, 2001
 Stictane fractilinea (Snellen, 1880)
 Stictane fusca (Hampson, 1901)
 Stictane muara Holloway, 2001
 Stictane obliquilinea Hampson, 1900
 Stictane obscura (Inoue, 1976)
 Stictane parvipectinata Holloway, 2001
 Stictane pectinata Holloway, 2001
 Stictane rectilinea (Snellen, 1879)
 Stictane serrata Holloway, 2001
 Stictane taeniatus (Rothschild, 1916)
 Stictane umbrata (van Eecke, 1927)

References

External links

Nudariina
Moth genera